Reality and Fantasy is the second studio album by Italian jazz singer Raphael Gualazzi, composed, produced and arranged by Gualazzi himself, it was released in Italy on 16 February 2011 on Sugar Music.

Background
The album features guest artists such as Italian trumpeter Fabrizio Bosso, Ferdinando Arnò, who co-produced the lead single "Follia d'amore", Vince Mendoza, James F. Reynolds, Pete Glenister and French DJ Gilles Peterson. As of June 2012, the album had sold more than 100,000 copies and it was certified platinum by the Federation of the Italian Music Industry. In October 2011, a special edition of the album was released in Italy, including bonus tracks and an additional DVD featuring the "Live Documentary", recorded on 24 June 2011 during Gualazzi's concert at the Auditorium Parco della Musica in Rome.
A new edition of the album was released in France by Blue Note Records in September 2012.

Singles
The first single from the album, "Follia d'amore", was the winner of the 61st Sanremo Music Festival in the newcomer artists' section and also won the Critics' "Mia Martini" Award for newcomers. It was chosen by a specific jury among the participants at the Sanremo Festival to be the Italian entry for the Eurovision Song Contest 2011 in Düsseldorf, Germany. It was the first Italian entry at the Eurovision Song Contest in 14 years since 1997. The song, performed in both Italian and English with the translated title "Madness of Love", came in second place. Other singles from the album were "A Three Second Breath", "Calda estate (dove sei)", "Love Goes Down Slow" and "Zuccherino dolce".

Track listing

Charts and certifications

Weekly charts

Certifications

Year-end charts

Personnel
Credits adapted from Allmusic.

Production credits 

 Ferdinando Arnò – additional production
 Emiliano Alborghetti – assistant
 Laura Borgognoni – art direction, design
 Marco Craig – cover photo, design, photography
 Giuseppe Dicecca – stylist
 David Frazer – engineer, mixing
 Donal Hodgson – engineer, mixing
 Joe LaPorta – mastering
 Emily Lazar – mastering
 Sabrina Mellace – stylist
 Mimmo Di Maggio - Hair and Make Up

Music credits

 Raphael Gualazzi – vocals, composer, lyricist, producer, kazoo, clavinet, organ, piano, background vocals, Wurlitzer
 Atem Quartet – saxophone
 Abigail Bailey – background vocals
 Lele Barbieri – drums
 David Bartelucci – tenor saxophone
 Fabrizio Bosso – trumpet
 Karl Brazil – drums
 David Brutti – contralto saxophone
 Giuseppe Conte – bass, guitar
 Felice Del Gaudio – electric bass, double bass
 Duke Ellington – composer
 Luca Florian – percussion
 Pete Glenister – guitar, percussion, producer
 Oliviero Malaspina – composer, lyricist
 Christian Marini – drums
 Mr. Wallace – arranger
 Malcolm Moore – bass
 James Reynolds – harmonica, mixing, producer
 Roxanne Tataei – vocals
 Massimo Valentini – baritone sax, saxophone
 Matteo Villa – contralto saxophone
 Fio Zanotti – composer

Release history

References

2011 albums
Raphael Gualazzi albums
Italian-language albums